William Dolman may refer to:

 William Dolman (coroner) (fl. 1990s–2000s), British coroner
 Bill Dolman (1906—1964), English footballer

See also
 Bill Doleman (born 1966), American television sports anchor
 William Doleman (1838–1918), Scottish amateur golfer